D'Arcy Boulton may refer to:
G. D'Arcy Boulton (1759–1834), lawyer, judge and political figure in Upper Canada
D'Arcy Boulton (Ontario politician) (1825–1875), grandson of the above; Canadian lawyer, politician and Orangeman
D'Arcy Boulton (heraldist) (born 1946), Canadian heraldist